Antigonus or Antigonos, a Greek name meaning "comparable to his father" or "worthy of his father", may refer to:

Rulers 
 Three Macedonian kings of the Antigonid dynasty that succeeded Alexander the Great:
 Antigonus I Monophthalmus (382–301 BC)
 Antigonus II Gonatas (319–239 BC)
 Antigonus III Doson (263–221 BC)
 Antigonus, son of Echecrates, the nephew of Antigonus III Doson
 Antigonus II Mattathias (died 37 BC), last ruler of the Hasmonean kingdom of Judea

Military leaders 
 Antigonus (Seleucid admiral), son of Menophilus, Seleucid admiral of the mid-2nd century BC
 Antigonus, a general of King Perseus in the Third Macedonian War, was sent to Aenia to guard the coast

Authors
 Antigonus (historian), Greek writer on history
 Antigonus of Alexandria, ancient Greek grammarian
 Antigonus of Carystus, 3rd century BC Greek writer on various subjects
 Antigonus of Cumae, ancient Greek writer on agriculture
 Antigonus of Sokho, Jewish scholar of the 3rd century BC
 Antigonus, writer on painting, mentioned by Diogenes Laërtius

Others
 Antigonus (physician), an ancient Greek surgeon
 Antigonus (sculptor), a Greek sculptor of the 3rd century BC
 Antigonos (son of Callas), Macedonian hetairos and athlete of the late 4th century BC
 Antigonus (butterfly), a genus of skipper butterflies